Lycée de Garçons Esch-sur-Alzette, abbreviated to LGE, is a high school in Esch-sur-Alzette, in south-western Luxembourg. Despite the name, the LGE is not an all-boys school, but open to women since 1969.

At the heart of the school is the original neo-classical building, built in 1909.  This was first augmented in 1957, and the school underwent a rapid expansion in the 1960s and 1970s.

It got visited from US Ambassador Thomas Barrett in 2022.

Footnotes

External links
 Lycée de Garçons Esch-sur-Alzette official website

Lycées in Luxembourg
Schools in Esch-sur-Alzette
Boys' schools in Luxembourg
Educational institutions established in 1901
Educational institutions in Luxembourg
Neoclassical architecture
1901 establishments in Luxembourg